Thorbjørn Egner (12 December 1912 – 24 December 1990) was a Norwegian playwright, songwriter and illustrator known principally for his books, plays and musicals for children. He is principally associated with his narratives for children including Karius og Baktus (1949) and Folk og røvere i Kardemomme by (1955).

Biography
He grew up in the working-class neighbourhood Kampen in Oslo, Norway. His parents were Magnus Egner (1872–1952) and Anna Hansen (1874–1957).
He was trained as an artist at the Norwegian National Academy of Craft and Art Industry under Eivind Nielsen and Per Krohg 1933–34.

He started his career in advertising. Over a seven year period, he was employed as a designer and decorator at the advertising firm Høydahl Ohme A/S.
His breakthrough was on the nationally broadcast children's radio show Barnetimen for de minste in the beginning of the 1950s.
Egner is particularly known for his books Karius og Baktus (1949), Thorbjørn Egners lesebøker (1950–1972), Klatremus og de andre dyrene i Hakkebakkeskogen (1953) and Folk og røvere i Kardemomme by (1955, translated 1976). The latter two were made into successful musicals. He also illustrated his own books.

Thorbjørn Egner received the Royal Norwegian Order of St. Olav in 1972 and Cappelenprisen in 1979.  He also awarded the Spellemannprisen in 1975 for Ole Brumm og vennene hans, in 1977 for the album Folk og røvere i Kardemomme by and in 1982 for Beste Egnerviser, a collection of his songs.

Personal life
In 1937, Thorbjørn Egner married Annie Eliassen (born in 1912 in Oslo). They had four children together. 
Egner died in the afternoon of Christmas Eve 1990 of a heart attack.
He was buried at Ullern Church (Ullern kirkegård) in Oslo. He is the great-grandfather of ski jumper Halvor Egner Granerud.

Selected publications

Books
Gamle hus i Vågå (1943)
Gamle hus i Rauland (1945)

Children's books
Barneboka, (1940, with Sigurd Winsnes)
Malermester Klattiklatt dypper kosten - og tar fatt (1940)
Truls og Kari: en liten bok for store og små (1941)
Truls og Kari kommer til den store byen (1942)
Ola-Ola som alle dyra var så glad i (1942)
Småfolk (1942)
Jumbo som dro ut i verden (1943)
Klattiklatt i hjemmefronten (1945)
Hesten, kua og de andre (1945)
Da Per var ku (1946)
Karius og Baktus (1949)
Tretten viser fra barnetimen (songbook, 1951)
Nye viser fra barnetimen (songbook, 1952)
Klatremus og de andre dyrene i Hakkebakkeskogen (1953)
Folk og røvere i Kardemomme by (1955)
Tommy og elefanten (1958)
4 Verden er stor (1972)

Albums

Kardemommeviser (1955)
Doktor Dyregod (1955)
Karius og Baktus (1957)
Ole Brumm (Winnie the Pooh) og vennene hans (stories 1-4, 1974; stories 5-8, 1975; stories 9-11, 1976)
Folk og røvere i Kardemomme by (1975)
De seksten beste Egnerviser (issued 1982; recorded 1953–1982)
Hakkebakkeskogen (2012)

Films
Karius og Baktus (1955, puppet film, directed by Ivo Caprino)
Klatremus i knipe (1955, puppet film, directed by Ivo Caprino)
Folk og røvere i Kardemomme by (1988, directed by Bente Erichsen)
Dyrene i Hakkebakkeskogen (2016, puppet film, directed by Rasmus A. Sivertsen)

References

Other sources
Christopher Hals Gylseth (2000) Thorbjørn Egner. Tigergutt kan alt!  (Schibsted)  
Erle M. Stokke, Astrid Hagen Krog  (1999) Thorbjørn Egner, Forfatterskapslesning i skolen (Biblioteksentralen)

External links
Thorbjørn Egner profile at Ballade
Thorbjørn Egner profile at Aftenposten

1912 births
1990 deaths
Musicians from Oslo
Writers from Oslo
Artists from Oslo
Oslo National Academy of the Arts alumni
Norwegian children's writers
Norwegian non-fiction writers
20th-century Norwegian writers
20th-century Norwegian male singers
20th-century Norwegian singers
Norwegian male artists
Norwegian illustrators
Norwegian male composers
Norwegian singer-songwriters
Spellemannprisen winners
Recipients of the St. Olav's Medal
20th-century Norwegian male musicians